Vadim Yevgenyevich Bulavinov (born 20 March 1963) is a Russian politician.

Biography 
Vadim Bulavinov was born in 1963 in Sormovo district of Gorky to a family of steelmaker and kindergarten employee. After graduating from Gorky school No. 117 he worked as a locksmith at Krasnoye Sormovo shipyard. After being conscripted in the Soviet Army Bulavinov served in the Northern Group of Forces as a tankist. In 1985 he joined the separate battalion of militsiya responsible for the private security. In 1990 he graduated from the All-Union Correspondence Institute of Law.

In 1993 Bulavinov was elected to the 1st State Duma in the Kanavinsky constituency. He was a member of the "Liberal Democratic Union on December 12" and "Stability" factions. From 1995 to 1999 he was a member of the Nizhny Novgorod City Duma, chairing the local self-government committee. In 1996–99 Bulavinov was general director of Seti-NN TV station. In December 1999, he was elected member of the 3rd State Duma. He was deputy chairman of the "People's Deputy" faction. In 1997 and 2001 Bulavinov was nominated for governor of Nizhny Novgorod Oblast, finishing third in both races.

On 29 September 2002 Bulavinov was elected mayor of Nizhny Novgorod and joined the United Russia party. On 16 October 2005 he was re-elected for a second term, gaining more than 77.5% of the vote. His term ended in October 2010. According to the new law, the head of the city administration was now to be hired under a contract. Governor Valery Shantsev refused to nominate Bulavinov for now ceremonial post of mayor, saying that he "cannot give an impetus to the dynamic development of the city in the future."

On 30 December 2010, three months after Bulavinov's mayoral term expired, he took the seat of the resigned State Duma member Valery Kornilov. In 2011 he was elected to the 6th State Duma, listed second on the United Russia's regional list after Valery Shantsev. In 2016 and 2021 Bulavinov won the Kanavinsky constituency.

In January 2013, the Investigative Committee requested the Prosecutor General's Office to send a motion to the lower house to lift Bulavinov's parliamentary immunity for abuse of power during his mayoralty. However, the prosecutor's office ignored investigators' request.

On 16 June 2014, Bulavinov was taken to the medical unit of Domodedovo Airport, because he could not leave the plane on his own, which arrived from Alicante, Spain. The media reported that lawmaker was allegedly in a state of intoxication and was removed from the aircraft due to "incorrect behavior." Bulavinov himself said that he felt unwell after arriving at the airport. On July 4, he was relieved of his post as head of the Volga Interregional Coordinating Council of the United Russia party. In November 2017 Bulavinov became secretary of Nizhny Novgorod regional branch of the party. He was forced to resign three weeks later as he was detained by traffic police for drunk driving.

References 

1963 births
Living people
First convocation members of the State Duma (Russian Federation)
Third convocation members of the State Duma (Russian Federation)
Mayors of Nizhny Novgorod
Fifth convocation members of the State Duma (Russian Federation)
Sixth convocation members of the State Duma (Russian Federation)
Seventh convocation members of the State Duma (Russian Federation)
Eighth convocation members of the State Duma (Russian Federation)
United Russia politicians